Look is a 2009 short film written and directed by Ryan Pickett. The short film centres on a barmaid named Emma and her glamorisation of the life of a mysterious model. Prominent themes of the film include escapism and romanticism.

Plot 
Look is about a barmaid, Emma (Starina Johnson), who is caught in a daydream when interrupted by a lost model (Theresa Meeker). The desire for beauty reveals an unsettling emptiness.

Cast 
 Starina Johnson as Emma
 John Ferguson as John
 Theresa Meeker as Supermodel
 Alison Parson as Hair/Makeup Artist
 Ryan Pickett as Photographer

Accolades

Premier and distribution
Look was premiered at the Regal Cinemas theatre in Green Hills, Tennessee, in spring 2009. Look has distribution through IndieFlix and Indiepix Films online video streaming services.

Production 
Look was directed, co-written, produced and edited by Ryan Pickett, who was a top five finalist in the Race to BE entrepreneurship competition hosted by Russell Simmons in Los Angeles.  Look was shot with the Red One 4K in Nashville, Tennessee.

Reviews 
Look was received with praise from critics for its visual poetry:

References

External links
 
 
 Look at Rotten Tomatoes
 EPK for Look

2009 films
2000s avant-garde and experimental films
2009 drama films
American drama films
American avant-garde and experimental films
Films set in Tennessee
2000s English-language films
2000s American films